is a passenger railway station on the Seibu Ikebukuro Line located in the city of Kiyose, Tokyo, Japan, operated by the private railway operator Seibu Railway.

Lines

Station layout
The station has two ground-level island platforms serving four tracks. A siding between the running tracks is located to the west of the station for services terminating and reversing at Kiyose.

Platforms

History
The station opened on June 11, 1924.

Station numbering was introduced on all Seibu Railway lines during fiscal 2012, with Kiyose Station becoming "SI15".

Passenger statistics
In fiscal 2019, the station was the 13th busiest on the Seibu network with an average of 69,578 passengers daily. 

The passenger figures for previous years are as shown below.

Surrounding area
 Japanese Nursing Association Training Centre
 
 Japan College of Social Work
 National Hospital Organization Tokyo National Hospital
 Tama Zenshoen Sanatorium
 Tokyo Metropolitan Kiyose High School

See also
List of railway stations in Japan

References

External links

 Kiyose Station information (Seibu Railway) 

Railway stations in Japan opened in 1924
Seibu Ikebukuro Line
Railway stations in Tokyo
Kiyose, Tokyo